Weighted voting can exist in a policy or law making body in which each representative has a variable voting power (weighted vote) as determined by the number principals who have made that person their proxy, or the population or the electorate they serve.  

By contrast weighted preference/preferential voting typically amasses a qualitative verdict of the voters.  Within this form of ranked voting, a few advanced proportional voting methods ask each voter to grade the suitability for office of as many candidates as they wish. For example, the merit of each candidate to be graded Excellent, Very Good, Good, Acceptable, Poor, or Reject (and where all these grade count, assigned values such as 5 to 0).  Under this, each member can by chosen by and/or could exercise a different weighted vote. In this way, each and every voting citizen is represented proportionately. No citizen's vote is "wasted".

A third definition is weighted bias voting. This exists in an electoral system in which not all the votes inherently vary in strength depending on the voter. Some voters, perhaps based on expertise, are given more weight than others. This is directly analogous to some preference shares. Listing Rules, the risk of a derivative suit, and of misrepresentation action may impose a cap on any enhanced voting rights attached, or to be attached, to preference shares. In the same way the existence of Unreformed House of Commons franchise-appointing small municipal corporations, was among injustices partly addressed by the Reform Act 1832 (widely known as the First Great Reform Act) in the United Kingdom.  Being in the financial pocket of a sponsor, these were rebuked as pocket boroughs.

The first definition, the delegate, elector or representative weighted voting definition is common at highest levels of governance and decision-making. This type of feature of an electoral system is used in many companies' shareholder meetings.  As is the third, in companies, which is called a poll – votes are weighted by the shares that each shareholder owns. Such a poll can be demanded unless a unanimous show of hands exists by an adequate quorum; however both principles are defined by company law norms and can be broken by a company's rules, if to do so is legally compliant to its country of registration (ideally being its shareholder dispute jurisdiction).  Other examples of the first form, weighted voting, are the United States Electoral College and the European council, where the number of votes of each member state is proportional to the state's population or voting-age electorate.

Historical examples

Ancient Rome 
The Roman assemblies provided for weighted voting after the person's tribal affiliation and social class (i.e. wealth). Rather than counting one vote per citizen, the assemblies convened in blocs (tribes or centuries), with the plurality of voters in each bloc deciding the vote of the bloc as an entity (which candidate to support or whether to favor or reject a law, for instance). Men of certain tribes and a higher social standing convened in smaller blocs, thus giving their individual vote the effect of many poor citizens' votes. In the Plebeian Council, where only the plebs could participate, these effects were somewhat relaxed, thus making the decision to grant its decisions (called plebiscites) the full force of law controversial (Lex Hortensia in 287 BC).

Central Europe 
In several Western democracies, such as Sweden and pre-unitary Germany, weighted voting preceded equal and universal suffrage, as well as women's suffrage, to different extents. In Sweden, universal and equal male suffrage to the lower house (Andra kammaren) was introduced by Arvid Lindman's first cabinet, while voting for city and county councils, which indirectly decided the composition of the upper house (Första kammaren), was graded along a 40-degree scale. Certain corporations also had votes of their own, thus multiplying the political strength of its owners. Weighted voting was abolished in Nils Eden's reforms of 1918-19, when female suffrage was also introduced.

French colonies 
After 1946 and the Brazzaville Conference of 1944, French colonial authorities set up a system of double collège where the local population would be divided in two electoral colleges, both returning the same numbers of delegates, the first being composed by French citizens and évolués and the second by natives with indigenous status.

This system was also used in French Algeria until 1958.

This system was abolished on 1958 with the Loi Cadre Defferre.

Southern Rhodesia 
Under its 1961 Constitution, the British colony of Southern Rhodesia provided for a special form of weighted voting called cross-voting. Essentially, voters were rounded up in two voters' rolls, with the A roll bearing requirements generally reached by the European-descended population, but only in a few cases by Africans. The B roll provided for many Africans and a few Europeans, but not all the adult population. Despite its limited size in terms of voters, the A roll played the major influence in electing the 65 members of parliament, which was further bolstered by the lack of support to sign up for the B roll, and its much lower turnout.

In 1969, cross-voting was abolished altogether in favor of a de jure segregationist weighted voting system, in which the A roll (electing 50 seats) was reserved for Europeans, Coloureds and Asians meeting higher property and education requirements, and the B roll (electing eight seats) reserved for Africans meeting lower property and education requirements. In its 1970 general election, about 50,000 A roll voters (essentially all white) elected 50 parliamentary seats, a little more than 1000 tribal chiefs elected eight special seats, whereas the rest of the population were to be content with the remaining eight seats.

Hong Kong

The Hong Kong legislature elects 30 out of 90 of its members through so-called ’Functional Constituencies’, which in effect represent local business interests in a corporatist manner.

The mathematics of weighted voting

A weighted voting system is characterized by three things — the players, the weights and the quota. The voters are the players (P1, P2, . . ., PN). N denotes the total number of players. A player's weight (w) is the number of votes he controls. The quota (q) is the minimum number of votes required to pass a motion. Any integer is a possible choice for the quota as long as it is more than 50% of the total number of votes but is no more than 100% of the total number of votes. Each weighted voting system can be described using the generic form [q : w1, w2, . . ., wN]. The weights are always listed in numerical order, starting with the highest.

The notion of power 
When considering motions, all reasonable electoral systems will have the same outcome as majority rules. Thus, the mathematics of weighted voting systems looks at the notion of power: who has it and how much do they have? A player's power is defined as that player's ability to influence decisions.

Consider the voting system [6: 5, 3, 2]. Notice that a motion can only be passed with the support of P1. In this situation, P1 has veto power. A player is said to have veto power if a motion cannot pass without the support of that player. This does not mean a motion is guaranteed to pass with the support of that player.

Now let us look at the weighted voting system [10: 11, 6, 3]. With 11 votes, P1 is called a dictator. A player is typically considered a dictator if their weight is equal to or greater than the quota. The difference between a dictator and a player with veto power is that a motion is guaranteed to pass if the dictator votes in favor of it.

A dummy is any player, regardless of their weight, who has no say in the outcome of the election. A player without any say in the outcome is a player without power. Consider the weighted voting system [8: 4, 4, 2, 1]. In this voting system, the voter with weight 2 seems like he has more power than the voter with weight 1, however the reality is that both voters have no power whatsoever (neither can affect the passing of a motion). Dummies always appear in weighted voting systems that have a dictator but also occur in other weighted voting systems (the example above).

Measuring a player's power
A player's weight is not always an accurate depiction of that player's power. Sometimes, a player with several votes can have little power. For example, consider the weighted voting system [20: 10, 10, 9]. Although P3 has almost as many votes as the other players, their votes will never affect the outcome. Conversely, a player with just a few votes may hold quite a bit of power. Take the weighted voting system [7: 4, 2, 1] for example. No motion can be passed without the unanimous support of all the players. Thus, P3 holds just as much power as P1.

It is more accurate to measure a player's power using either the Banzhaf power index or the Shapley–Shubik power index. The two power indexes often come up with different measures of power for each player yet neither one is necessarily a more accurate depiction. Thus, which method is best for measuring power is based on which assumption best fits the situation. The Banzhaf measure of power is based on the idea that players are free to come and go from coalitions, negotiating their allegiance. The Shapley–Shubik measure centers on the assumption that  a player makes a commitment to stay upon joining a coalition.

Parental vote
It has been proposed that a parent should get a vote for each dependent child, to increase the birth rate or to increase the importance of long-term planning as an election issue. This was proposed in France in 1871 by Louis Henri de Gueydon; in the UK in 2003 by Demos, and in 2007 by Dutch economist Lans Bovenberg. It is a policy of the Christian Party of Austria and has been proposed by some members of Law and Justice in Poland.

See also
Corporatism
Electoral college
Preference voting
Plural voting
Prussian three-class franchise
Anonymity (social choice) - a requirement that is incompatible with weighted voting.
Vicente Blanco Gaspar

References

Electoral systems